Lyuban District (Lyubanski rayon, Lyubansky raion) is a district of Minsk Region, Belarus. The capital of the district is Lyuban.

Notable residents 
 
 Władysław Syrokomla (known in Belarus as Uladzislaǔ Syrakomla) (1823, Smolków estate – 1862), poet, writer and translator

References

External links

 
Districts of Minsk Region